Below is an incomplete list of fictional television series which feature events of World War II in the narrative.

1950s

1960s

1970s

1980s

1990s

2000s

2010s

2020s

Science fiction and fantasy

See also
List of World War II films
List of World War II short films

References

 
Lists of World War II films
Lists of television series by genre